Cockermouth was a rural district in Cumberland, England from 1894 to 1974.

It was created by the Local Government Act 1894 based on Cockermouth rural sanitary district.  It entirely surrounded but did not include the towns of Cockermouth and Keswick, and also surrounded Maryport on its land side.

It was abolished by the Local Government Act 1972 on 1 April 1974 and has since formed part of the Allerdale district of Cumbria.

References
https://web.archive.org/web/20070930220337/http://www.visionofbritain.org.uk/relationships.jsp?u_id=10003416

Districts of England created by the Local Government Act 1894
Districts of England abolished by the Local Government Act 1972
History of Cumbria
History of Cumberland
Rural districts of England